Newsline may refer to:

 Newsline, a daily news and current affairs radio programme and podcast produced by Radio Netherlands
 BBC Newsline, a television newscast produced by BBC Northern Ireland
 Newsline (magazine), a monthly newsmagazine published from Karachi, Sindh, Pakistan
 The News Line, a Trotskyist daily paper in the United Kingdom
 Newsline, an independent production company in the Channel Islands, producer of Channel Television news bulletins
 Newsline (Japanese TV series), a flagship news programme on NHK World TV
 Newsline (PR Newswire), a collection of specific news media which a PR Newswire news release will reach
 Newsline (ACQ-KBN)
 Newsline (Thai TV program), an English language news program, broadcast live on National Broadcasting Services of Thailand (NBT)
 Newsline Express
 Newsline Philippines
 Newsline with Jim Middleton an Australian news program on the ABC
 Newsline World
 Newsline, an Indonesian language news program that aired on Metro TV